"Southern Girl" is a 2013 song by Tim McGraw

Southern Girl may also refer to:
Good Southern Girl album by Amanda Shaw
"Southern Girls", song written by Rick Nielsen and Tom Petersson first released by Cheap Trick 1977 
"Southern Girl", song by Maze (band) Featuring Frankie Beverly	1980, No.9 R&B charts
"Southern Girl", song by  Simon Stokes and The Nighthawks	1970